Owen J. Dougherty (September 14, 1929 – February 27, 1991) was an American football and baseball player and coach. He served as the head football coach at Indiana University of Pennsylvania from 1979 to 1981, compiling a record of 17–13. Dougherty was also the head baseball coach at IUP from 1963 to 1969 and again in 1990, tallying a mark of 133–58.

Dougherty died after heart surgery on February 27, 1991, at Allegheny General Hospital in Pittsburgh, Pennsylvania.

Head coaching record

Football

References

1929 births
1991 deaths
IUP Crimson Hawks baseball coaches
IUP Crimson Hawks football coaches
Penn State Nittany Lions baseball players
Penn State Nittany Lions football players
Players of American football from Pennsylvania